Zélia Maria Cardoso de Mello (born September 20, 1953, in São Paulo) served as Brazil's Minister of Economy from 1990 to 1991 under Fernando Collor de Mello. She was later married to Brazilian comedian Chico Anysio, with whom she has two children, Rodrigo and Victoria. The couple divorced in 1998.

Zélia Cardoso de Mello worked in the academic, public and private sectors in Brazil. She graduated from FEA-USP where she also got her PhD degree in economics. She was a professor at the University of São Paulo for almost 20 years.

Her political career began in 1986 when Dilson Funaro, the Minister of Finance of Brazil, invited her to join his Economic Advisory Team as Director of the National Treasure Dept. In 1990 Cardoso de Mello was appointed the National Minister of Economy, Finance and Planning of Brazil under president Fernando Collor de Mello.  After significant criticism, she resigned this position in May 1991.

In 1991, she released a biography, "Zelia, A Passion".  It became a best-seller, perhaps because, according to a review, "It says little about tax reform and inflation, but a lot about Cardoso's sexual exploits in office."

In 1995 she moved to New York City and became a visiting scholar at the Institute of Latin America and Iberian Studies at Columbia University. Since 1998, Cardoso de Mello has served executive positions at several major financial advisory companies focused on Brazil, including Global Access Investments, Orix and Lily Pond Capital. Her academic career was entirely accomplished in the School of Business and Economics at the University of São Paulo, where she achieved both her college degree and her doctorate, and where served as university professor. She is currently a partner at New York-based Aquila Associates.

Finance minister

As minister, Zélia was responsible for the implementation of the Plano Collor, which combined fiscal and trade liberalization with radical inflation stabilization measures. A monetarist inflation stabilization was coupled with an industrial and foreign trade reform program, the Industrial and Foreign Trade Policy (Portuguese: Política Industrial e de Comércio Exterior), better known as PICE, and a privatization program dubbed the "National Privatization Program" (Portuguese: Programa Nacional de Desestatização), better known as the PND. The PICE was geared towards opening the Brazilian marketing to foreign competition while simultaneously fostering domestic innovation, whereas the PND was the first large-scale privatization program in Brazil, generating nearly US$4 billion for the government and privatizing 18 different state-owned enterprises.

According to Carlos Eduardo Carvalho, from Departamento de Economia da Pontifícia Universidade Católica de São Paulo:  The Collor Plan itself began to be formatted by the president-elects advisors at the end of December 1989, after his victory in the runoff election. The final draft was probably strongly influenced by a document discussed by the advisors of PMDB party candidate Ulysses Guimarães, and later by advisors of PT party candidate Luiz Inácio Lula da Silva, during the period between the general election and the runoff. In spite of the differences in their general economic strategies, these competing candidates failed to develop their own stabilization policies at a time of rapid price increases and risk of hyperinflation during the second half of 1989. The proposal to block liquidity originated in academic debate and was imposed upon the main presidential candidacies.

See also
 Plano Collor
 Fernando Collor de Mello

Notes

References
 Joseph A. Page (1995), The Brazilians. Da Capo Press. .
 Government biography (Portuguese language). Accessed August 15, 2005.
 Época magazine story (Portuguese language). Accessed August 15, 2005.

External links
 
 Interview to Revista Isto é Dinheiro (Portuguese)
 The good results of privatization, Revista Bovespa (Portuguese)
 Women in action, Revista Bovespa (Portuguese)

1953 births
Brazilian economists
Brazilian women economists
Living people
Academic staff of the University of São Paulo
University of São Paulo alumni
People from São Paulo
Finance Ministers of Brazil
Government ministers of Brazil
Women government ministers of Brazil